Georges Robert (born 23 April 1903, date of death unknown) was a French racing cyclist. He rode in the 1928 Tour de France.

References

1903 births
Year of death missing
French male cyclists
Place of birth missing